Coscinium may refer to:
 Coscinium (plant), a genus of plants in the family Menispermaceae
 Coscinium (bryozoan), an extinct genus of prehistoric bryozoans in the family Hexagonellidae